{{Infobox settlement
| official_name            = Neyshabur
| native_name              = 
| settlement_type          = City
| other_name               = Raēvant,  Abarshahr,  Shadiyakh 
| image_skyline            = 

Nishapur or officially Romanized as Neyshabur (from Middle Persian "New-Shapuhr", meaning: "The New City of Shapur", "The Fair Shapur", or "The Perfect built of Shapur") is the second-largest city of Razavi Khorasan Province in the Northeast of Iran. Nishapur is situated in a fertile plain at the foot of Binalud Mountain Range and has been the historic capital of the Western Quarter of Greater Khorasan, the historic capital of the 9th-century Tahirid dynasty, the initial capital of the 11th-century Seljuk Empire, and is currently the capital city of Nishapur County and a historic Silk Road city of cultural and economic importance in Iran and the region of Greater Khorasan.

As of 2016, its central city population was estimated to be 264,180 and its county's population was estimated to be 448,125 making it the third most-populous city in the eastern provinces of Iran after Mashhad and Zahedan. Nearby are turquoise mines that have supplied the world with turquoise of the finest and the highest quality for at least two millennia.

The city was founded in the 3rd century by Shapur I as a capital city of Sasanian satrapy known as Abarshahr or Nishapur. Nishapur later became the capital of Tahirid dynasty and was reformed by Abdullah Tahir in 830, and was later selected as the capital of Seljuk dynasty by Tughril in 1037. From the Abbasid era to the Mongol invasion of Khwarezmia and Eastern Iran, the city evolved into a significant cultural, commercial, and intellectual center within the Islamic world. Nishapur, along with Merv, Herat and Balkh, was one of the four great cities of Greater Khorasan and one of the greatest cities of the Old World in the Islamic Golden Age with strategic importance, a seat of governmental power in the eastern section of caliphates, a dwelling place for diverse ethnic and religious groups and a trading stop on commercial routes from Transoxiana, China, Iraq and Egypt.

Nishapur reached the height of its prosperity under the Samanids in the 10th century but was destroyed and most of its population was slaughtered by the Mongols in 1221. This massacre, combined with subsequent earthquakes and other invasions, is believed to have destroyed the city several times. Unlike its near neighbor Merv, Nishapur managed to recover from these cataclysmic events, and survive until the present day as an active modern city and county in tourism, agriculture, health care, industrial production and commerce in Razavi Khorasan Province of Iran; however, many of its older and historical archeological remains are left to be uncovered.

The modern city of Nishapur is composed of three main administrative areas/districts (Persian: منطقه های شهر نیشابور) and is surrounded by many villages which are joining in to the urban area and structure of the city. The Area/district 1 of the city comprises the newer urban developments (initiated mostly in the 1980s and the 1990s) made to the north of the Road 44 and is home to the most of the main higher educational institutions of Nishapur such as the University of Neyshabur and the IAUN. The Area/district 2 of the city comprises the downtown of the city and the older and more historic urban structures situated on the south of the Road 44. It is home to some of the main tourists attractions of the city such as the National Garden of Nishapur and the Khanate Mansion of Amin Islami. The Area/district 3 of the city is home to the ruins and the remains of the ancient city of Nishapur destroyed by Mongols in the Middle Ages and is located on the south and the southeast of the city. The third district of the city is a national and registered protected archeological area by law and any unauthorized archeological excavation is considered illegal. This district is also home to the burial and historical monuments (some are shown on the city infobox) of most of the renowned persons of the city throughout history such as the Mausoleum of Omar Khayyám  and the Mausoleum of Attar of Nishapur. The third district is also used as one of the main touristic hotspots of the city.

Many of this city's archeological discoveries are held and shown to the public in the Metropolitan Museum of Art in New York City, the British Museum in London, the National Museum of Iran in Tehran, other international museums and the museums of the city of Nishapur. The city of Nishapur is also a member of international organizations such as the LHC and the ICCN UNESCO.

History
History of Nishapur has been intermingled with myths and different historical narratives. According to different mythological and historical narratives, the city was founded 7500 years ago during the reign of mythical line of primordial kings known as the Pishdadian dynasty. According to Arthur Christensen, Nishapur was founded in the year 260 A.D. Nishapur was founded by the Sasanian emperor Shapur II during the last years of his rule, as demonstrated by new archaeological findings. In the 9th century, Nishapur became the capital of the Tahirid dynasty, and by the 10th century, was under Samanid rule. The city became an important and prosperous administrative center under the Samanids. In 1037, it was conquered by the Seljuks. Despite being sacked by the Oghuz Turks in 1154, and suffering several earthquakes in the twelfth and thirteenth centuries, yet continued as an important urban center until it was destroyed again by Genghis Khan and the Mongols in 1221.

During the Sasanian dynasty and medieval ages, the Nishapur quarter (Persian: ربع نیشابور) included Khorasan Province and Ahal Province.

Ancient history

Abarshahr of Sassanid Empire 
Abarshahr was a satrapy (province) of the Sassanid Empire. Cities in the region were Candac, Artacauan, Apameia, and Pushang (founded by Shapur I). Nishapur was the capital. Abarshar was the name used for Nishapur during the Sassanid Empire and Rashidun Caliphate. The capital was a vital center of administration and of communications between Bactria, India, and Sagistan. The region was involved in the Indian and Chinese trade. Its governor bore the title of kanarang.

Names of Nishapur throughout history 
Abarshahr or Aparshahr  was a satrapy (province) of the Sassanid Empire now located in Nishapur. Cities in the region were Candac, Artacauan, and Apameia, and Pushang (founded by Shapur I) and the capital was Nishapur. Abarshar was the name of Nishapur during the Sassanid Empire and the Rashidun Caliphate. The capital was a vital point of administration and of communications between Bactria, India, and Sagistan. The region was involved in the Indian and Chinese trade. Its governor bore the unique title of kanarang.
Neysabur or Naysabur was named Abarshahr during the Muslim occupation of Khorasan and Nishapur, and was the city's official name during the Rashidun Caliphate, Umayyad Caliphate, and Abbasid Caliphate.

Middle Ages

Muslim Conquest 
Nishapur was conquered by the Rashidun Caliphate, without struggle, during the caliphate of Umar. The Caliph appointed Ahnaf Ibn Qais as the chief command of the Rashidun army out of Isfahan. From Isfahan, two routes led to Khorasan: the main route via Rayy and the other via Nishapur. The people of Nishapur chose not to fight and surrendered on the condition of paying a tribute.

Having conquered the region around Nishapur, the Muslim force advanced to Nishapur itself. The city was divided into four sectors, with each sector under a Persian chief. These chiefs shut themselves in the city and closed the gates. The Muslims laid siege to the city for some days. In the meantime, the Persian chiefs quarreled among themselves. One of the chiefs entered into negotiations with the Muslims. He offered to open one of the gates for the Muslim army to enter, provided he was granted immunity. The Muslims accepted the offer. The Persians were taken by surprise, and the Muslims became the new rulers of Nishapur. After consolidating their position at Nishapur, the Muslims conquered other cities around Nishapur, including Pusht, Ashband, Rukh, Zar, Khaf, Osparain and Arghian.

Nishapur capital of Abu Muslim 
Abu Muslim became the governor of Khorasan, and chose Nishapur as his capital. He seems to have initiated a huge building program in which he stimulated the growth of the city. Nishapur increased in importance, and two of the ‘Abbasids were governors of this city before becoming caliphs. It was the governor of Khurasan (‘Ali ibn Isa ibn Mahan) who presented the large gift of Chinese imperial porcelains to Harun al-Rashid (see Abbasid Ceramics Section), demonstrating the strategic importance of the province on trade routes.

Tahirid dynasty in Nishapur 
The Tahirid dynasty was an Iranian Persian dynasty that ruled from 820 to 872 in Khorasan, northeastern Greater Iran, a region now split between Iran, Afghanistan, Tajikistan, Turkmenistan, and Uzbekistan. The Tahirid capital was originally Merv but was moved to Nishapur. The Tahirid dynasty is considered to be the first Iranian dynasty independent from the Abbasid caliphate established in Khorasan.

Although nominally subject to the Abbasid caliphate in Baghdad, the Tahirid rulers were effectively independent. The dynasty was founded by Tahir ibn Husayn, a leading general in the service of the Abbasid caliph Al-Ma'mun. Tahir's military victories were rewarded with the gift of lands in the east of Persia, which were subsequently extended by his successors as far as the borders of India. Tahirid influence extended to Baghdad when the Abbasids granted them the military affairs in Mesopotamia.

Saffarids 
In 872, the Tahirids were replaced by the Saffarids. Saffarids expanded their sphere of influence through the north of Khurasan and also in south towards Sistan. They also made Nishapur their capital and rebuilt the Tahirid palace, only to be overrun early in the tenth century by their powerful eastern neighbours, the Samanids. This dynasty had been placed in power in Transoxiana by Caliph Al-Ma'mun, and ruled first from Samarqand and then moved to Bukhara. After defeating the Saffarids, their "empire", with nominal sanction from the Abbasids, extended from India to Iraq. Khurasan was thus an international entrepôt, with merchants coming not only from Iraq, India and Egypt, but also from Russia; additionally, Vikings came from Scandinavia to trade with the Bulghars and Khazars on the Caspian Sea.
Nishapur occupies an important strategic position astride the old Silk Road that linked Anatolia and the Mediterranean Sea with China. On the Silk Road, Nishapur has often defined the flexible frontier between the Iranian plateau and Central Asia. The town derived its name from its reputed founder, the Sassanian king Shapur I, who is said to have established it in the third century CE. Nearby are the turquoise mines that supplied the world with turquoise for at least two millennia.

It became an important town in the Greater Khorasan region but subsequently declined in significance until a revival in its fortunes in the 9th century under the Tahirid dynasty, when the glazed ceramics of Nishapur formed an important item of trade to the west. For a time Nishapur rivaled Baghdad or Cairo: Toghrül, the first ruler of the Seljuk dynasty, made Nishapur his residence in 1037 and proclaimed himself sultan there, but it declined thereafter, as Seljuk fortunes were concentrated in the west. In the year 1000 CE, it was among the ten largest cities on earth.

Mongol siege of Nishapur 

In 1221, after the death of Tuqachar, the husband of Genghis Khan's daughter, the entire city of Nishapur was destroyed by the Mongols over the course of 10 days. Genghis Khan's daughter requested the death of every resident of the city as vengeance for her husband's death. In order to become sure that no wounded would survive the massacre, Khan's troops killed and beheaded most of the population of the city and their skulls were reputedly piled in pyramids by the Mongols. Women, Infants, children, and even cats and dogs were among the beheaded. After the massacre a much smaller settlement was established just north of the ancient town, and the once bustling metropolis lay underground—until a team of excavators from the Metropolitan Museum of Art arrived in the mid-20th century. They worked at Nishapur between 1935 and 1940, returning for a final season in the winter of 1947–48. What remains of old Nishapur is a 3500-hectare "Kohandejh (Persian: کهن دژ)" area, south of the current city of Nishapur.

Ilkhanate and Timurid reign 

In 1221, during the Mongol conquest of the Khwarazmian Empire, Nishapur was besieged and sacked, and a great number of its inhabitants killed and beheaded. Genghis Khan is said to have ordered the destruction of the whole city in retaliation for the death of his son-in-law during the siege. Their skulls were reputedly piled in pyramids by the Mongols. After the massacre a much smaller settlement was established just north of the ancient town, and the once bustling metropolis lay underground—until a team of excavators from the Metropolitan Museum of Art arrived in the mid-20th century. They worked at Nishapur between 1935 and 1940, returning for a final season in the winter of 1947–48.

After the fall of Nishapur in 1221 by the Mongols, the structures of the city were weakened and the agricultural output of the city was reduced. Mahmud Ghazan and Abu Sa'id Bahadur Khan tried to make the city flourish again and the city's population grew once more and some of the villages around the city were improved and rebuilt. Hamdallah Mustawfi had visited the city of Nishapur in the Year 1339 or 1340. During this era, the ambassador of Henry III of Castile, Ruy González de Clavijo reached Nishapur and according to him, Nishapur had become a highly productive agricultural center with 40 non-stop working mills along the ''Abe Bostan'' (Mir Ab River of Nishapur). The current position of the city was formed during this era and on the North West of the older position of the city which is now home to the Mausoleum of Attar of Nishapur and Shadiyakh Archeological Site and other remains of the old position of the city (the old position of the city is also now a protected archeological site by law though it is endangered). Mausoleum of Attar of Nishapur and the Jame mosque of Nishapur (congregational mosque of the city) are among the examples of the buildings built during this era in Nishapur. Many poets, scholars and renowned historical figures of the city and the wider region of Abarshahr ( one of the main four regions of Greater Khorasan with the city capitals of Nishapur, Merv, Herat and Balkh) were also born in this period.

Early modern era

Safavid Era (16th to early 18th century) 

Due to a conflict between the supporters of the Mohammad Khodabanda, the Safavid Shah of Persia, and his son Abbas the Great. In 1581 the castle of Nishapur went under siege. This siege became one of the events that helped the Abbas the Great to become the Ruler of Greater Khorasan and later the Shah of Persia in the Safavid Empire. In 1592 Abbas the Great took back the control of Nishapur from the Shaybanids. Shah Abbasi Caravanseri of Nishapur was also built during his reign and later on, he left his two epigraphs on Jame Mosque of Nishapur on the Ramadan of October 1612.

Saadat Ali Khan I Nishapuri, Nawab of Awadh (the ruler who governed the state of Awadh of India), was also born in this period in an influential family in Nishapur.

Afsharid and Qajar Era (18th & 19th century) 

After the death of Nader Shah Afshar in 1747, the area became an independent khanate under the reign of the Bayat chieftains. In 1751 Ahmad Shah Durrani captured Nishapur with the support of heavy artillery and imposed Shahrokh Shah as the ruler (Shah) of the western part of Greater Khorasan.

The city was conquered in 1800 by the Qajars. In 1828, the city came under the influence of the Zafaranlu Confederacy but was given back to the Qajars in 1829. During the Revolt of Hasan Khan Salar, the city was an isolated outpost of Qajar rule led by Imamverdi Khan Bayat when most of Khorasan was under the wrath of Hasan Khan Salar. On March 21, 1849, Qajar forces entered Nishapur.

Contemporary history

Pahlavi dynasty 

The reconstruction of the Mausoleum of Omar Khayyam in Nishapur was commissioned by Reza Shah. Omar's previous tomb was separated from his tomb, and a white marble monument (Current Mausoleum), designed by the Iranian architect Hooshang Seyhoun, was erected over it. This mausoleum became one of the main symbols of the city and one of the known works of the modern Persian architecture. The influence of the architectural design of this mausoleum is visible on the coat of arms of the University of Neyshabur, Neyshabur University of Medical Sciences (NUMS) and other public, civil and private organizations of the city. The construction of the new mausoleum was completed in the year 1963. The Tomb of Kamal-ol Molk was also built in Nishapur and designed by Seyhoun. The Wooden Mosque of Neyshabur was also built in the year 2000.

The Second Asia-Pacific Jamboree was held at Baghrud Scots Park of Nishapur in preparation for The 15th World Scout Jamboree which was scheduled to be held 15–23 July 1979 in Nishapur but due to the political uncertainty of the Iranian Revolution in the country, the event was cancelled.

Post Iranian revolution 
On February 18, 2004, in the Nishapur train disaster, a train carrying flammable goods derailed and caught fire near the town. Five hours later, during fire fighting and rescue work, a massive explosion destroyed the train and many nearby buildings. Around 300 people were said to have been killed, mainly fire and rescue workers but also the local governor and mayor and the heads of the fire and rail services. This disaster has become known as one of the worst railway industry disasters of the world.

Archaeological discoveries 
Little archaeology has been done on this vast and complicated site. George Curzon remarked that Nishapur had been destroyed and rebuilt more times than any other city in history, an evocative statement whether or not it is statistically true. The Metropolitan Museum of Art undertook excavations from 1935 that were interrupted in 1940. Searching largely for museum-worthy trophies that they shared with the government of the Shah, the Metropolitan's publications were limited to its own Nishapur ceramics. The site of Nishapur has been ransacked for half a century since World War II, to feed the international market demand for early Islamic works of art.

Shadiyakh ("Palace of Happiness") was one of the main palaces of old Nishapur up to the 9th century AD, which became more important and populated after that. Some notable people like Attar lived there. Attar's tomb is nowadays in that area. This palace was perhaps completely ruined in the 13th century.

Geography 

Nishapur is located at an elevation of 1250 meters on a wide fertile plain at the southwestern foot of the Binalud Mountain range in northcentral Razavi Khorasan Province. The city is connected by both railways and highways to the cities of Mashhad and Tehran. The city also has local routes and highways to the cities of Kashmar and Quchan.

Weather and climate

Sources of the Middle Ages 
Throughout the Middle Ages, Nishpaur had been praised by many due to its many gardens and its healthy climate in Khorasan. Ibn Hawqal has commented the following about the weather and the climate of this city at that time:Throughout all of Khorasan, no such companion as enriched with the health of the air, quantity and the vastness of its mansions can be found.In the same cited work, Hakim Nishapuri praises Nishapur with many favourable nicknames such as " " and compares and claims that the weather and climate (or air Persian: هوا) of Nishapur was better and more healthier (according to him, cholera and other such diseases and disasters could not be found in Nishapur) than many neighboring regions such as Sistan (due to its winds), Indus valley (or سند in Persian) and Hindustan (due to their severe hotness), Khwarazm and Turkestan (due to their coldness) and Merv (due to presence of many insects).

Modern 
Nishapur generally has a warm and semi-dry climate called ''central Iranian plateau climate''. Precipitation mostly happens in spring and winter. Nishapur is situated on a relatively higher elevation (1250 meters) than its neighboring cities such Sabzevar and Mashhad hence the weather is milder and better than these cities.

Climate 
Nishapur has a cold semi-arid climate (BSk).

Geology 
The city of Nishapur lies on a Holocene alluvial plain on top of the Pleistocene sediments in the southwestern part of the Binalud Mountains. The Binalud Range, running northwest–southeast, is made predominantly of Triassic and Jurassic rocks. On the southern side of the northwestern part of the range there is a section of Eocene rocks that are volcanic in origin. The well-known Nishabur turquoise comes from the weathered and broken trachytes and andesites of the Eocene volcanic rocks of this part of the mountain range. The main turquoise mines are situated about 50 kilometers northwest of the city of Nishapur in the foothills of the Binalud Range.

Seismicity 
Nishapur is located in a region with a rather high risk of earthquakes. Many earthquakes have seriously harmed the city; among the important ones are the historical earthquakes that ruined the city in the 12th and 13th centuries.

Economy 

The economy of Nishapur is diverse and it is based on several industries like Agriculture, Industrial parks, mining, tourism, health-care, retailing, banking etc.

Food & Agriculture 
Many agricultural products such as saffron, cereals, cotton, herbs, plums, walnut, wheat, corn, apples, cherries and pistachio are exported from the county of Nishapur. The city is also a dairy and sugar exporter.

Water supply 
Most of the water supply of the city is provided from the Binalud Mountain Range's mostly seasonal rivers, qanats, dams and modern wells.

Mining 
Natural recourses such as turquoise and salt are mined from around the city.

Energy 
The electrical power supply of the city is provided from Neyshabur Combined Cycle Power Plant and Binalood Wind Farm. The excessive electrical energy of the city is mostly exported from the city's public power grid.

Industry 
Khorasan Steel Complex and two main industrial parks called the Khayyam Industrial Park and the Attar Industrial Park are near the city of Nishapur. Many industrial products such as sugar, cooking oils and gas heaters are exported from the city and its county.

Tourism 
Several hotels, ecolodges, resorts, parks, tourist hot-spots, restaurants, museums, a planetarium, cultural centers, mausoleums, religious pilgrimage sites and historic mosques are in and near the city. The tourism industry of the city has a lot of protentional but it needs further development.

Health care 
There are two active hospitals (Hakim Hospital and 22 Bahman Hospital) in the city of Nishapur and a third one is also currently under construction.

Banks 
Nearly all of reputable public and private Iranain banks have branches in the city.

Companies 
Major Iranian companies such as Refah Chain Stores Co., Iran Hyper Star, Ofoqh Kourosh and other companies have active branches in Nishapur.

Transportation

Road 44 
Road 44, a major national expressway that connects the two major cities of Tehran and Mashhad, is connected to the city of Nishapur and it passes through it.

Rail transport 

Nishapur is connected to the Trans-Iranian Railway System which is a UNESCO world heritage. The Nishapur train station became operational during the reign of Mohammad Reza Pahlavi and it is located on the southern part of the city.

Nishapur train disaster 

On 18 February 2004, runaway train wagons crashed into the village of Khayyam near Nishapur. This accident caused several major explosions and it kill over 300. The entire village of Khayyam was destroyed due to the explosions.

Public transport 
The intercity bus terminal of the city is located at the eastern part of the city close to the road 44. Several public bus lines and stations are also active within the city.

Airport 
Currently there is only one airport near the north of the city that is only authorized to be used for gliders and small aircraft however, there are plans for building a proper airport near the south of the city of Nishapur.

People

Language 
Most people speak Persian and are monolingual, however, there are several private foreign language-teaching institutions in the city that teach English and other languages.

Mythology and religion 

Nishapur has been of importance in Iranian mythology. Before the Islamization of Iran, Zoroastrianism had been the major religion of Nishapur. Rivand (one of the ancient names of Nishapur) has been mentioned in Avesta and subsequently in Shahnameh. Adur Burzen-Mihr a Zoroastrian fire temple of the highest grade was situated in Rivand Mountains (Binalud mountains) of Nishapur and the lake Rivand of Nishapur was built due to a fight between Ahriman and water (probably by water it was meant Anahita in the Persian text of the Persian wiki). Also, according to Hakim Nishapuri, Dež-e Sɑngi was built by Seth on a giant round soft (flat) stone There are also signs of the influence of Christianity in Nishapur (a street in Nishapur has been called and is still called Masih and also a village on the south of the city was called Masih Abad). After the rise of Islam however, the people living in and near the city of Neyshabur became Muslims. Nishapur and its people have also had an influence on Sufism (an Islamic mystic practice). Poets and Sufis such as Attar of Nishapur who had been born in this city had had a profound influence on Islamic mysticism. In the 10th century, Nishapur had been one of the centers of Ismaili missionary spread in Iran and Greater Khorasan. Most of the Ismailis of Nishapur now live in Dizbad and some in the main city itself. Jama'at Khana Dizbad is the most important Ismaili center in Nishapur today. From the third to the sixth of Hejri Ghamari, Nishapur was one of the centers of Sufism. Most Sufis and Sufi elders in Nishapur were Sunnis and followers of the Shafi'i school.

Notable people 

Sorted by date
Mazdak – (died c. 524 or 528) was a Zoroastrian prophet, Iranian reformer and religious activist
Kanarang – was a unique title in the Sassanid army, given to the commander of the Sassanid Empire's northeastern most frontier province, Abarshahr (encompassing the cities of Tus, Nishapur and Abiward).
Behafarid – was an 8th-century Persian Zoroastrian heresiarch
Sunpadh – (died 755) cleric
Ishaq Ibn Rahwayh – muhaddith, faqih
Abu al-Abbas Iranshahri – 9th-century philosopher, mathematician, natural scientist, historian of religion, astronomer and author
Ibn Khuzaymah – Muslim scholar
Muslim ibn al-Hajjaj – Muslim scholar and one of the most prominent muhaddith in history
Abu al-Hassan al-Amiri – (died 992) was a Muslim theologian and philosopher
Abū al-Wafā' Būzjānī – (10 June 940 – 15 July 998) was a mathematician and astronomer
Hakim al-Nishaburi – (933–1012), was a Sunni scholar and historian
Ahmad ibn Ibrahim al-Naysaburi – Isma'ili theologian and historian
Tha'ālibī -(961–1038), Muslim philologist, writer and poet
Ahmad ibn 'Imad al-Din – was a Persian physician and alchemist. He was probably from Nishapur in the 11th century.
Ibn Abi Sadiq – was an 11th-century Persian physician
Abū-Sa'īd Abul-Khayr – (December 7, 967 – January 12, 1049) was a famous Persian Sufi and poet
Al-Juwayni (1028–1085 CE) was a Sunni Shafi'i Faqih and Mutakallim.
Ahmad ibn Muhammad al-Tha'labi – was an 11th-century Islamic scholar.
Abd al-Karīm ibn Hawāzin Qushayri – was born in 986 CE (376 AH), Philosopher and Sufi
Omar Khayyám – (18 May 1048 – 4 December 1131) was a Persian polymath, philosopher, mathematician, astronomer and poet.
Abd al-Ghafir al-Farsi – (1059-1135), Persian scholar of Arabic, history and hadith
Mu'izzi – was an 11th and 12th-centuries poet
Haji Bektash Veli – was a Muslim mystic
Attar of Nishapur – (c. 1145 – c. 1221), was a Muslim poet, theoretician of Sufism, and hagiographer.
Abu al-Qasim al-Habib Neishapuri – physician mid-15th century.
Saadat Ali Khan I – (b. c. 1680 – d. 19 March 1739) was the Subahdar Nawab of Oudh. All the rulers of Oudh State in India belonged to a Shia Muslim dynasty of Persian origin from Nishapur. They were renowned for their secularism and broad outlook. After they rebelled against the British their state was annexed to form the United Provinces of Agra and Oudh.
Hamid Hussain Musavi – i (born 1830 – died 1880) was a leading Shia scholar
Heydar Yaghma –
Badi' –
Abolghasem Sakhdari – wrestler
Saeed Khani – footballer
Yaghoub Ali Shourvarzi – wrestler
Nur-Ali Shushtari –
Esmail Shooshtari –
Parviz Meshkatian –
Mohammad-Reza Shafiei Kadkani – i (born 1939) is a Persian writer, poet, literary critic, editor, and translator.
Hossein Vahid Khorasani(born January 1, 1921) is an Iranian Twelver Shia Marja
Abdolreza Kahani Director
Hamed Behdad(1973) Actor

Culture and Art
During the 10th century, Nishapur was a thriving economic center home to many religious scholars and artists. Nishapur was located along the Silk Road. An influential trade route connecting China to the Mediterranean Sea. It was a center for cotton, silk, textile and ceramic production. In efforts to uncover the history of life in this city, the Metropolitan Museum of Art put together an excavation team composed of researchers Joseph Upton, Walter Hauser and Charles Wilkinson. From 1935 to 1940, the team worked to rediscover the ancient city. They were authorized to work under the conditions that half of the material found must be shared with the Iran Bastan Museum in Tehran. Along with pottery, excavators uncovered glass, metalwork, coins and decorated wall fragments. Over the years of excavations, thousands of items were uncovered which provided information on local artistic traditions.

Tepe Madraseh

The most elaborate architectural excavation took place at the site called Tepe Madraseh. This massive complex had been thoughtfully planned and embellished with many decorative elements. Plaster panels had been carved and painted, along with walls, brickwork and glazed ceramic tiles. A madraseh is a place for religious learning. Such sites have peaked the interest of scholars for centuries for their function and architectural designs. Like most Islamic architecture the entire complex of Tepe Madaseh was oriented to face Mecca. The bricks used to construct most of the structures had been dried in the kilns located on the outskirts of the complex.

Pottery 
Nishapur during the Islamic Golden Age, especially the 9th and 10th centuries, was one of the great centers of pottery and related arts. Most of the Ceramic artifacts discovered in Nishapur are preserved in the Metropolitan Museum of Art and Museums in Nishapur, Tehran and Mashhad. Ceramics produced at Nishapur showed links with Sassanid art and Central Asian. Nowadays there are 4 Pottery workshops in Nishapur.

Bowls including bold black inscriptions in the so-called Kufic angular calligraphy were apparently produced in the important ceramic centers of Nishapur in eastern Iran, and Afrasiyab, or Old Samarqand, in present-day Uzbekistan. The text often contains a proverb in Arabic or, as in this case, a series of wishes: "Blessing, happiness, prosperity, good health, and success."

Form and function of Nishapur pottery

"Although the decoration of pottery may only tell us a little about the people who used it, the form of a vessel is directly related to its function". The Pottery of Nishapur incorporated strong colored slips and bold patterns. Common decoration included geometric and vegetal patterns, calligraphy, figures and animals. The ceramic pieces uncovered at Nishapur consisted mainly of vessels and utilitarian wares. Objects such as plates, bowls, bottles, jars, pitchers, coin banks and even a toy hen were found. One decorative technique specifically utilized by Nishapur potters was the refined use of chattering, a rippled texture achieved when trimming a vessel on the wheel. The polychrome ware of Nishapur indicates the significant advances in glaze technology that were being discovered during the 10th century. It also indicates how an objects aesthetic became an important part of the piece as a whole.

A selection of these discoveries is shown in the gallery below:

Anthem of Nishapur 
The special Anthem of Nishapur was unveiled for the first time on April 14, 2011; it has introduction and three parts, noted on three invasive and destructive in the history of Nishapur, delineated by frightening sounds of bells, along with sounds of percussion and wailing women represent the miseries caused by these attacks.

Literature 

Throughout history, Nishapur has been mentioned and praised in the Persian literature for several times (Mostly due to its prosperity and gardens). This city has been the birthplace and home of many famous Persian poets such as Omar Khayyam, Attar of Nishapur, Heydar Yaghma, Shafiei Kadkani and more. Foreign writers such as André Gide (in The Fruits of the Earth) and Jorge Luis Borges have also mentioned this city in their work(s).

Music 
Throughout history, music in Nishapur has been influenced by Sassanid, Maqami and traditional styles and is a part of  the Khorasani Folk Music that has been popular in Nishapur. Following the UNESCO World Register of Maqami Music in Northern Khorasan, research on music in Nishapur has been considered. Maghami music festivals have been also active in Nishapur. One of the oldest study sources related to Iranian music is Resal-e Neyshaburi (in Persian:رساله نیشابور) written by Mohammad bin Mahmoud of Nishapur, which highlights the importance of music in old Nishapur. Among the influential people of Nishapur in music Ratebe Neyshaburi (during the reign of Tahirids), and the contemporary Parviz Meshkatian can be named.

Other influences 
 Yo-Yo Ma released an instrumental track entitled "Blue as the Turquoise Night of Neyshabur" as part of the Silk Road Project.
 US band Santana released an instrumental track entitled "Incident at Neshabur" on their 1970 LP release, Abraxas. Carlos Santana says this was a reference to a place in Haiti.

Sports 

The 15th World Scout Jamboree was scheduled to be held 15–23 July 1979 and was to be hosted by Pahlavi Iran at Nishapur, but was cancelled due to the Iranian Revolution in 1979.

Video games 
 Nishapur is included as a playable setting in a historical video game series called ''Crusader Kings''.
Nishapur is included as a playable setting in a historical video game called ''Historinica''.

Films and cinema

Paintings

Local and cultural days

Gastronomy and food culture 

The most important foods and drinks in Nishapur are rhubarb and sharbat. Rhubarb (Persian  or '), a sour vegetable, grows at the foot of the eponymous Rivand Mountains  (Mount Binalud). ''Aush Komay'' is also a local Aush made from a vegetable called ''کمای''. Haleem of Neyshabur is also popular in the region along with other common Iranian foods and drinks.

Carpet-weaving 
Weaving carpets and rugs common in the more than 470 villages in Nishapur County, the most important carpet Workshop located in the villages of: Shafi' Abad, Garineh, Darrud, Baghshan, Kharv, Bozghan, Sayyed Abad, Sar Chah, Suleymani, Sultan Abad and Eshgh Abad. Nishapur Carpet workshops weaved the biggest Carpets in the world, like carpets of: Sheikh Zayed Mosque, Sultan Qaboos Grand Mosque, Armenian Presidential Palace, Embassy of Finland in Tehran, Mohammed Al-Ameen Mosque in Oman.

Modern art of carpet in Nishapur began in 1946 after inauguration of a carpet-weaving workshop in a caravansary.

Turquoise masonry 

For at least 2,000 years, Iran, known before as Persia, has remained an important source of turquoise, which was named by Iranians initially "pirouzeh" meaning "victory" and later after Arab invasion "firouzeh". As an important source of turquoise, Nishapur has been sometimes referred to as the "city of turquoise" throughout history. In Iranian architecture, the blue turquoise was used to cover the domes of the Iranian palaces because its intense blue color was also a symbol of heaven on earth.

This deposit, which is blue naturally, and turns green when heated due to dehydration, is restricted to a mine-riddled region in Nishapur, the  mountain peak of Ali-mersai, which is tens of kilometers from Mashhad, the capital of Khorasan province, Iran. Nishapur's turquoise has been sold as souvenirs and jewelry in Nishapur and Mashhad. A weathered and broken trachyte is host to the turquoise, which is found both in situ between layers of limonite and sandstone, and amongst the scree at the mountain's base. These workings, together with those of the Sinai Peninsula, are the oldest known.

Architecture and monuments 
A selection of historical buildings and monuments of the city is shown in the city info box on the top of this article, and on the gallery below:

Popular culture 
Nasir Khusraw  saw Nishapur and  wrote about  it in Safarnama.
Abraham Valentine Williams Jackson in "From Constantinople to the home of Omar Khayyam" explain ending of his Travel in Nishapur.

Education

Schools, universities and colleges

High schools 

There are several high schools in the city and the county. The most famous and the oldest of which is Omar Khayyam High School.

Higher education 
The University of Neyshabur, Neyshabur University of Medical Sciences (NUMS), the Islamic Azad University of Neyshabur (IAUN), the Payame Noor University of Neyshabur and the Technical and Vocational University of Neyshabur, are the main universities of the city along with several other public and private technical, vocational, and part-time colleges and schools.

Sport centers 
Enghelab Sports Complex is an indoor arena in Nishapur. The arena houses Nishapur's basketball, volleyball, and futsal teams. Nishapur has one professional football team, Jahan Electric Nishapur, that competes in the Razavi Khorasan's Provincial Leagues.

Mass media

Newspaper publishing 
General publications in Nishapur includes the weekly and local newspapers. The first local newspaper of Khorasan province is Morning of Nishapur, published since 1989. Others include Shadiakh, published since 2000, Khayyam Nameh, since 2004, Nasim, since 2006, and Far reh Simorgh, since 2010.

Public Broadcasting 
IRIB center of Mashhad covers the news of Nishapur.

Printing
Two book publishers working in the city are Klidar & Abar Shahr.

Twin towns – sister cities

Nishapur is twinned with:

 Baghdad, Iraq
 Balkh, Afghanistan
 Basra, Iraq
 Bukhara, Uzbekistan
 Ghazni, Afghanistan
 Herat, Afghanistan
 Kairouan, Tunisia
 Karbala, Iraq
 Khiva, Uzbekistan
 Khoy, Iran
 Khujand, Tajikistan
 Konya, Turkey
 Kulob, Tajikistan
 Merv, Turkmenistan
 Samarkand, Uzbekistan

See also

Greater Khorasan
Adur Burzen-Mihr
Merv
Herat
Balkh
Samarkand
Bukhara
Neyshabur county
Omar Khayyam Neyshaburi
Attar of Nishapur
The Great Seljuik Empire
University of Neyshabur
IAUN
Saeedi Garden

Notes

References

Bibliography
 Tarkhi Al Naisaburiin Bye Hakim al-Nishaburi
 EARTHQUAKES IN THE HISTORY OF NISHAPUR By Charles Melville 
 Encyclopedia Iranica
 metmuseum
 iranica
 The Patricians of Nishapur: A Study in Medieval Islamic Social History by Richard Bulliet
 France-Diplomatie

Further reading
 
 Nishapur: Glass of the Early Islamic Period by Jens Kroger, Jens Kröger (1995) (free download & online version)
 Nishapur: Some Early Islamic Buildings and Their Decoration by Charles Kyrle Wilkinson (1987) (free download & online version)
 Nishapur: Metalwork of the Early Islamic Period by James W. Allan (1982) (free download & online version)
 Nishapur: Pottery of the Early Islamic Period by Charles Kyrle Wilkinson (1973) (free download & online version)

External links

 Nishapur Mayors 
Nishapur governors 
Ceramics of Nishapur and other centers

Nishapur Mathhouse
Neyshabur bonyad 
The Metropolitan Museum Excavations at Nishapur
 Elias Pirasteh, Neyshabur, Photo Set, flickr
 Ardavan Ruzbeh, When National Heritage is not an equal to the Emām-Jom'eh, a reportage on the demolition of a national monument, Madreseh-ye Golshan (مدرسه گلشن), in Nishabur, in Persian, Radio Zamāneh, May 29, 2008: Text, Audio.
 Hossein Davoudi, Dizbād: A Staircase to History, in Persian, Jadid Online, 2008.A Slide Show of Dizbād, by Hossein Davoudi, Jadid Online, 2008,  (5 min 39 sec).Note: Dizbād is a small village between Mashhad and Neyshābūr, located at some 40 km distance from Mashhad.

 
Populated places in Nishapur County
Cities in Razavi Khorasan Province
Populated places along the Silk Road
Sasanian cities
Ancient Iranian cities
Archaeological sites in Iran
Ismaili centres
Amṣar
Capitals of caliphates
Former capitals of Iran
Seljuk Empire
Shapur I
National works of Iran